Abachausia is a genus of moths belonging to the family Pyralidae. It contains only one species Abachausia grisea, which is found in Namibia and South Africa.

References

Phycitinae
Monotypic moth genera
Moths of Africa
Taxa named by Boris Balinsky
Pyralidae genera